Gutian 4th Road Station, is a station of Line 1 of Wuhan Metro. It entered revenue service on July 29, 2010. It is located in Qiaokou District.

Station layout

Transfers
Bus transfers to Route 2, 222, 505, 508, 512, 531, 546, 548, 550, 558, 560, 621, 737, 741 and 806 are available at Gutian 4th Road Station.

References

Wuhan Metro stations
Line 1, Wuhan Metro
Railway stations in China opened in 2010